AGM-123 Skipper II is a short-range laser-guided missile developed by the United States Navy. The Skipper was intended as an anti-ship weapon, capable of disabling the largest vessels with a 1,000-lb (450-kg) impact-fuzed warhead.

Design 
The AGM-123 is composed out of a Mk 83 low-drag general purpose bomb fitted with a Paveway guidance kit and one Aerojet Mk 78 solid propellant rocket that fires upon launch. The rocket allows the AGM-123 to be dropped farther away from the target than could free-fall bombs, which helps protect the delivery aircraft from surface-to-air-missiles and anti-aircraft artillery near the target.

The AGM-123 was developed at the China Lake Naval Weapons Center and was carried by the A-6E Intruder, A-7 Corsair II, and F/A-18.

Operational history
Four Skipper missiles launched by A-6E Intruders contributed to sinking the Iranian frigate Sahand during Operation Praying Mantis on April 18, 1988.

Skipper missiles were also fired in Operation Desert Storm against Iraqi surface vessels by A-6s and U.S. Marine aircraft.

Gallery

References

External links

Designation systems - Emerson Electric AGM-123 Skipper II
Federation of American Scientists - AGM-123 Skipper II

Cold War anti-ship missiles of the United States
Cold War air-to-surface missiles of the United States
Military equipment introduced in the 1980s